The British School, Alexandria is a British international school in Roushdy, in Alexandria, Egypt. It serves students ages 3–18.

History
In 1984, the school opened on the property of the British consulate and it had occupied five other locations.

As of 2015, its 433 students originated from 23 countries.

In 2019, the prep school relocated to a villa opposite the British Council offices.

In 2020, the school became an Egyptian school, taken over by Emerald (A governmental company) specialising in takeovers for the CERA group. The school has since been administered as a commercial profit making school my Eduhive, a small educational management company. The school lost its accreditation.

The Prep School

The prep school teaches children from year 1 to year 6

See also

 Education in Egypt
 List of international schools
 List of schools in Egypt

References

External links
 , the school's official website

1984 establishments in Egypt
British international schools in Egypt
Educational institutions established in 1984
Elementary and primary schools in Egypt
International high schools
International schools in Alexandria
Private schools in Alexandria
High schools and secondary schools in Egypt